NOAAS Miller Freeman (R 223) was an American fisheries and oceanographic research vessel that was in commission in the National Oceanic and Atmospheric Administration (NOAA) fleet from 1975 to 2013. Prior to her NOAA career, she was in commission in the United States Fish and Wildlife Services Bureau of Commercial Fisheries from 1967 to 1970 as US FWS Miller Freeman.

Construction and commissioning 
Miller Freeman was designed in 1965 to meet the Bureau of Commercial Fisheries need for a large vessel for oceanographic research and the open-ocean investigation of fisheries. She was built for the U.S. Fish and Wildlife Service by the American Shipbuilding Company in Toledo, Ohio. She was launched on 2 April 1966 and delivered in June 1967, and she was commissioned into service into the Fish and Wildlife Services Bureau of Commercial Fisheries as US FWS Miller Freeman.

Characteristics and capabilities 

When completed in 1967, Miller Freeman was the largest research ship in the history of the Bureau of Commercial Fisheries and its ancestor organizations, and she remained one of the largest research trawlers in the United States throughout her career. Her stern-ramp configuration allowed her to conduct trawling operations in deep-sea waters.

She had three A-frames; one of them is a  trawl gantry and the other two are  Oceo A-frames.

Miller Freeman had various laboratory capabilities, including s 300-square-foot (sq.-ft.) (27.9-square-meter) (m²) wet laboratory, a 300-sq.-ft. (27.9-m²) fish-processing laboratory, a 240-sq.-ft. (22.3-m²) rough laboratory, a 170-sq.-ft. (15.8-m²) ocean chemistry laboratory, and a 152-sq.-ft.(14.1-m²) acoustics laboratory. She also had a 220-sq.ft. (20.4-m²) data plot room and a 50-sq.-ft. (4.6-m²) autosalinomater room. She was outfitted with a large live-tank system which allowed scientists to sustain live sea specimens under pressure aboard ship.

In addition to her crew of 34, Miller Freeman could accommodate up to 11 scientists.

Service history 
Not yet fully rigged – for example, she had a two-ton (907-kg) crane on her port forecastle but no lifting capability aft – Miller Freeman proceeded after commissioning in 1967 from Ohio through Lake Erie, Lake Ontario, the St. Lawrence Seaway, and the Panama Canal to her home port at Seattle, Washington. However, she did not put to sea again until 1969, when she left Seattle for a cruise in the southern Bering Sea to conduct oceanographic and crab surveys for the Auke Bay Laboratory.

Due to a lack of funding for her operations, Miller Freeman was decommissioned on 1 July 1970. When NOAA was established on 3 October 1970, she became part of NOAAs fleet as NOAAS Miller Freeman (R 223), although she remained inactive. Work began on the completion of her rigging, but it, too, suffered from a lack of funding and was suspended at the end of 1972. Work on her rigging eventually resumed, including the installation of a much-needed five-ton (4,536-kg) crane aft, and when it finally was completed she was recommissioned in 1975. She was re-rigged in 1982.

Operated by NOAAs Office of Marine and Aviation Operations after her recommissioning with her home port at Seattle, Washington, Miller Freemans primary mission was to provide a working platform for the study of the ocean's living resources, operating primarily in the North Pacific Ocean and Bering Sea. After returning to service, she spent much of the remainder of 1975 conducting work in the Gulf of Alaska and Bering Sea in support of the NOAA Offshore Continental Shelf Survey and Assessment Program, primarily carrying out resource surveys for the Marine Resources Monitoring, Assessment, and Prediction Program (MARMAP). Her research activities were interrupted on 22 October 1975, when the United States Coast Guard asked her to assist the crabbing vessel Aquarian, which had lost her steering while operating in the Aleutian Islands. Despite the rough seas in 40- to 60-knot (74- to 111-km/hr) winds, Miller Freemans crew managed to get a line across to Aquarian and tow her to Akutan Island, ending a two-day ordeal for Aquarians crew.

In 1976, Miller Freeman discovered mastodon or mammoth tusk, tooth, and jaw fragments during trawl hauls in the Chukchi Sea and Kotzebue Sound. The discovery was of interest to researchers studying the ancient Bering Land Bridge.

In 1988, two of Miller Freemans crew members – Lieutenant Edward R. Cassano, NOAA Corps, and Daniel W. Granstrom – received the Department of Commerce Silver Medal for their role in fighting a major fire that broke out aboard the ship while she was in port at Seattle. Cassano and Granstrom went below decks to fight the fire without regard for their own safety and over the course of an hour repeatedly led firefighters of the Seattle Fire Department below decks to guide them in extinguishing the blaze, only allowing themselves to be treated for heat exhaustion after the fire was under control.

Miller Freeman became inactive in October 2010 and was decommissioned on 29 March 2013. Awaiting sale for scrapping, she was moored in Lake Washington in Seattle on 6 May 2013 when welding operations started an accidental fire in a storage locker aboard her. The Seattle Fire Department pumped carbon dioxide into the locker to extinguish the fire, and no injuries were reported.

Miller Freeman was sold at auction on 5 December 2013 for $337,550 (USD).

Post-decommissioning
As of early 2018, ex-Miller Freeman reportedly was tied up at a commercial tug and towing company's facilities adjacent to the Pattullo Bridge in the Fraser River at New Westminster, British Columbia, Canada. By early January 2019, she had been moved to Maple Ridge, British Columbia, also on the Fraser River, and had been tied up side-by-side with the former NOAA survey ship NOAAS Surveyor (S 132), which NOAA had decommissioned in 1995.

See also
 NOAA ships and aircraft

References

External links
 

Ships of the National Oceanic and Atmospheric Administration
Ships of the United States Fish and Wildlife Service
Ships built in Lorain, Ohio
1966 ships
Maritime incidents in 1975
Maritime incidents in 1988
Maritime incidents in 2013